Jalousie is a tango written by Danish composer Jacob Gade in 1925. Its full title is Jalousie "Tango Tzigane"  (Jealousy "Gypsy Tango"). It soon became popular around the world and is today a classic in the modern songbook.

Music
The work consists of two themes – the first "a temperamental theme in D minor", followed by a "lyrical section in D major", both with a typical tango rhythm. Although it became Gade's most popular and successful work, he wrote successor tangos, such as the Romanesca, Tango in 1933.

Composition
The composer claimed that the mood of the piece had been inspired by his reading a sensational news report of a crime of passion, and "jealousy" became fixed in his mind.

Gade was principal conductor of the 24-piece orchestra of the Palads Cinema in Copenhagen at the time he composed the piece. He wrote it at Tibirke Mølle, north Zealand, where he had a holiday home, as part of the musical accompaniment for the Danish premiere of the silent film Don Q, Son of Zorro. It was  performed under Gade's baton on the opening night, 14 September 1925.

Publication and performance history
The music was published in 1925 by Gade and Warny in Denmark, then the following year in New York and Paris. Radio broadcasts and its use in 1930s films spread its popularity. The first recording was made in 1935 by the Boston Pops Orchestra, conducted by Arthur Fiedler, on the Victor label. Many others followed, often in highly different arrangements.

The royalties from the performances of the work allowed Gade to found a charity to help young Danish musicians, called Jacob Gade's Legat.

In 1931 Vera Bloom (daughter of writer-politician Sol Bloom) provided English lyrics.  Alternate English lyrics were also composed by Winifred May.

Recordings
Arthur Fiedler and the Boston Pops Orchestra recorded a version that was released in November 1943 on V-Disc 52 (VP 161).

Harry James recorded a version in 1946 (released in 1947) on Columbia 37218.

As "Jalousie" the song was released on a single in 1951 by Frankie Laine with Paul Weston & his Orchestra (Columbia Records catalog number 4-39585). A cover version with amended English lyrics by Billy Fury reached No.2 on the UK singles chart in 1961, becoming Fury's highest-charting UK single.

Organist George Wright recorded a version in 1955 on the former Paradise Theatre Wurlitzer pipe organ that became a classic and was often used to demonstrated high-fidelity equipment.

Also in 1961, Esquivel recorded a popular "space age" version that later gained even more currency as the soundtrack of a classic Ernie Kovacs sketch in which office supplies come to life.

In addition to Bloom's, lyrics in many languages have been fitted to the composition.

In film and television 
With and without vocals the piece by its various names has been used in numerous films and in television, including:

 Don Q, Son of Zorro (1925), starring Douglas Fairbanks
 Anchors Aweigh (1945), a classic Gene Kelly, Frank Sinatra musical
 Conflict (1945), a Humphrey Bogart mystery
 Painting the Clouds with Sunshine (1951)
 Silent Movie (1976), a Mel Brooks satire
 Death on the Nile (1978), an Agatha Christie mystery
 Brusten Himmel (Swedish film) (1982)
 Schindler's List (1993), in the second scene in the cabaret
 The Man Who Cried (2000), with Johnny Depp playing a 1920s gypsy
 Fargo (TV series) (2020), in Season 4, Episode 2 The Land of Taking and Killing.

References

1925 compositions
Tangos
Tango in Denmark
Billy Fury songs
1925 songs